Köhnə Zuvand is a village and municipality in the Masally Rayon of Azerbaijan. It has a population of 625.

References

Populated places in Masally District